The bran-colored flycatcher (Myiophobus fasciatus) is a small passerine bird in the tyrant flycatcher family. It breeds from Costa Rica through South America  to  Bolivia,  Uruguay, and Argentina. It also occurs on Trinidad.

This species is found in open forests and secondary growth.  The deep cup nest is made of stems and bark and lined with fine plant fibers; it is suspended by the rim from a side branch low in a tree. The typical clutch is two cream-colored eggs with a rufous wreath. The female incubates for 17 days with a further 15–17 to fledging. This species is parasitized by the shiny cowbird.

The adult bran-colored flycatcher is 12.7 cm long and weighs 10.5g. The head and upperparts are dark reddish brown and the crown has a concealed yellow crest, which is erected by excited adults. There are two pale buff wing bars and the underparts are whitish shading to pale yellow on the belly and with dark streaking on the breast and flanks. The bill is black above and brown below. Sexes are similar, but young birds lack the crown patch.

Bran-colored flycatcher are solitary unobtrusive birds, sometimes difficult to see as they move rapidly through the undergrowth in search of small insects and berries. They have a whistled   call.

References

Further reading

External links
Bran-colored flycatcher photo gallery VIREO Photo-High Res--(Close-up)

bran-colored flycatcher
Birds of South America
Birds of the Cerrado
Birds of Costa Rica
Birds of Panama
Birds of Trinidad and Tobago
bran-colored flycatcher
Taxa named by Philipp Ludwig Statius Müller